Roger North may refer to:
Roger North, 2nd Baron North (1530–1600), English peer 
Roger North (governor) (1585–1652), captain who sailed with Walter Raleigh in 1617 and only governor of the Oyapoc
Roger North (biographer) (1653–1734), English lawyer, biographer, and amateur musician
Roger North (died 1651) (1577–1651), English politician
Roger North, modern day musician and inventor of the North Drums